Village in the Mist or Village of Haze is a 1983 South Korean film directed by Im Kwon-taek.

Plot
Unmarried Soo-ok leaves Seoul to teach at a remote village elementary school. She slowly begins to realize that there is a sexual connection between a local vagabond and the village's women, despite their men claiming that the vagabond is impotent.

Cast
Jeong Yun-hui
Ahn Sung-ki
Park Ji-hun
Jin Bong-jin
Oh Young-hwa
Lee Ye-min
Kim Ji-young
Jo Nam-gyeong
Choi Dong-joon
Jo In-seon

References

External links
 
 

1982 films
South Korean mystery films
Films directed by Im Kwon-taek
1980s Korean-language films
Grand Prize Paeksang Arts Award (Film) winners